General Darling may refer to:

Douglas Darling (1914–1978), British Army major general
Henry Darling (1780–1845), British Army major general
Kenneth Darling (1909–1998), British Army general
Ralph Darling (1772–1858), British Army general
Thomas G. Darling (born 1932), U.S. Air Force major general